NJAC is an abbreviation and may stand for:

 National Joint Action Committee, active Nationalist political party in Trinidad and Tobago
 New Jersey Administrative Code, a compendium of the regulations of the State of New Jersey, United States 
 New Jersey Association of Counties, advocacy group for county governments in New Jersey, United States
 New Jersey Athletic Conference, NCAA Division III college athletics conference in New Jersey
 National Judicial Appointments Commission, India